The Avalon in Birmingham, Alabama is a two-building Tudor Revival-style complex at 3005-3015 Highland Ave. and 3000-3020 13th Ave. S, which was built in 1925 and 1927.  It was listed on the National Register of Historic Places in 1985.

It was designed by architect Charles H. McCauley for the Birmingham Realty Company, successor firm to the Elyton Land Company, which was major in designing the layout of the city of Birmingham and which built Highland Avenue.

References

		
National Register of Historic Places in Jefferson County, Alabama
Tudor Revival architecture in the United States
Buildings and structures completed in 1925